Paavo Viktor Vesterinen (2 March 1918, in Laukaa – 26 June 1993) was a Finnish farmer and politician. He was a member of the Parliament of Finland from 1975 to 1987, representing the Centre Party. Vihtori Vesterinen was his father.

References

1918 births
1993 deaths
People from Laukaa
Centre Party (Finland) politicians
Members of the Parliament of Finland (1975–79)
Members of the Parliament of Finland (1979–83)
Members of the Parliament of Finland (1983–87)